The Line of Actual Control (LAC), in the context of the Sino-Indian border dispute, is a notional demarcation line
that separates Indian-controlled territory from Chinese-controlled territory. The concept was introduced by Chinese premier Zhou Enlai in a 1959  letter to Jawaharlal Nehru as the "line up to which each side exercises actual control", but rejected by Nehru as being incoherent. Subsequently, the term came to refer to the line formed after the 1962 Sino-Indian War.

The LAC is different from the borders claimed by each country in the Sino-Indian border dispute. The Indian claims include the entire Aksai Chin region and the Chinese claims include Arunachal Pradesh. These claims are not included in the concept of "actual control".

The LAC is generally divided into three sectors:
 the western sector between Ladakh on the Indian side and the Tibet and Xinjiang autonomous regions on the Chinese side. This sector was the location of the 2020 China–India skirmishes.
 the middle sector between Uttarakhand and Himachal Pradesh on the Indian side and the Tibet autonomous region on the Chinese side.
 the eastern sector between Arunachal Pradesh on the Indian side and the Tibet autonomous region on the Chinese side. This sector generally follows the McMahon Line.

The term "line of actual control" originally referred only to the boundary in the western sector after the 1962 Sino-Indian War, but during the 1990s came to refer to the entire de facto border.

Overview
The term "line of actual control" is said to have been used by Chinese Premier Zhou Enlai in a 1959 note to Indian Prime Minister Jawaharlal Nehru. The boundary existed only as an informal cease-fire line between India and China after the 1962 Sino-Indian War. In 1993, India and China agreed to respect of the 'Line of Actual Control' in a bilateral agreement, without demarcating the line itself.

In a letter dated 7 November 1959, Zhou proposed to Nehru that the armed forces of the two sides should withdraw 20 kilometres from the so-called McMahon Line in the east and "the line up to which each side exercises actual control in the west". Nehru rejected the proposal stating that there was complete disagreement between the two governments over the facts of possession:

Scholar Stephen Hoffmann states that Nehru was determined not to grant legitimacy to a concept that had no historical validity nor represent the situation on the ground.
During the Sino-Indian War (1962), Nehru again refused to recognise the line of control: "There is no sense or meaning in the Chinese offer to withdraw twenty kilometers from what they call 'line of actual control'. What is this 'line of control'? Is this the line they have created by aggression since the beginning of September? Advancing forty or sixty kilometers by blatant military aggression and offering to withdraw twenty kilometers provided both sides do this is a deceptive device which can fool nobody."

Zhou responded that the LAC was "basically still the line of actual control as existed between the Chinese and Indian sides on 7 November 1959. To put it concretely, in the eastern sector it coincides in the main with the so-called McMahon Line, and in the western and middle sectors it coincides in the main with the traditional customary line which has consistently been pointed out by China."

The term "LAC" gained legal recognition in Sino-Indian agreements signed in 1993 and 1996. The 1996 agreement states, "No activities of either side shall overstep the line of actual control." However clause number 6 of the 1993 Agreement on the Maintenance of Peace and Tranquility along the Line of Actual Control in the India-China Border Areas mentions, "The two sides agree that references to the line of actual control in this Agreement do not prejudice their respective positions on the boundary question".

The Indian government claims that Chinese troops continue to illegally enter the area hundreds of times every year, including aerial sightings and intrusions. In 2013, there was a three-week standoff (2013 Daulat Beg Oldi incident) between Indian and Chinese troops 30 km southeast of Daulat Beg Oldi. It was resolved and both Chinese and Indian troops withdrew in exchange for an Indian agreement to destroy some military structures over 250 km to the south near Chumar that the Chinese perceived as threatening.

In October 2013, India and China signed a border defence cooperation agreement to ensure that patrolling along the LAC does not escalate into armed conflict.

Evolution of the LAC

1956 and 1960 claim lines

LAC of 7 November 1959 
China's 1959 claim lines can be traced back to the Simla Convention, which gave birth to the McMahon Line that separated Tibet from India. Since signing the Simla Convention on 3 July 1914, the Chinese Government never raised any formal objection to the McMahon Line until January 1959, when Zhou Enlai, the first premier and head of government of the People's Republic of China, wrote a letter to then-prime minister of India, Jawahar Lal Nehru.

The date of 7 November 1959, on which the Chinese premier Zhou Enlai alluded to the concept of "line of actual control", achieved a certain sanctity in Chinese nomenclature. But there was no line defined in 1959. Scholars state that Chinese maps had shown a steadily advancing line in the western sector of the Sino-Indian boundary, each of which was identified as "the line of actual control as of 7 November 1959".

On 24 October 1962, after the initial thrust of the Chinese forces in the Sino-Indian War, the Chinese premier Zhou Enlai wrote to the heads of ten African and Asian nations outlining his proposals for peace, a fundamental tenet of which was that both sides should undertake not to cross the "line of actual control". This letter was accompanied by certain maps which again identified the "line of actual control as of 7 November 1959". Margaret Fisher calls it the "line of actual control as of 7 November 1959" as published in November 1962. Scholar Stephen Hoffmann states that the line represented not any position held by the Chinese on 7 November 1959, but rather incorporated the gains made by the Chinese army before and after the massive attack on 20 October 1962. In some cases, it went beyond the territory the Chinese army had reached.

India's understanding of the 1959 line passed through Haji Langar, Shamal Lungpa and Kongka La (the red line shown on Map 2).

Even though the Chinese-claimed line was not acceptable to India as the depiction of an actual position, it was apparently acceptable as the line from which the Chinese would undertake to withdraw 20 kilometres. Despite the non-acceptance by India of the Chinese proposals, the Chinese did withdraw 20 kilometres from this line, and henceforth continued to depict it as the "line of actual control of 1959".

In December 1962, representatives of six African and Asian nations met in Colombo to develop peace proposals for India and China. Their proposals formalised the Chinese pledge of 20-kilometre withdrawal and the same line was used, labelled as "the line from which the Chinese forces will withdraw 20 km."

This line was essentially forgotten by both sides till 2013, when the Chinese PLA revived it during its Depsang incursion as a new border claim.

Line separating the forces before 8 September 1962 
At the end of the 1962 war, India demanded that the Chinese withdraw to their positions on 8 September 1962 (the blue line in Map 2).

1993 agreement 

Political relations following the 1962 war only saw signs of improvement towards the later 1970s and 80s. Ties had remained strained until then also because of Chinese attraction to Pakistan during India Pakistan wars in 1965 and 1971. Restored ambassadorial relations in 1976, a visit of the Indian Prime Minister to China in 1988, a visit of the Chinese Premier to India in 1992 and then a visit of Indian President to China in 1992 preceded the 1993 agreement. Prior to the 1993 agreement, a trade agreement was signed in 1984, followed by a cultural cooperation agreement in 1988.

The 1993 agreement, signed on 7 September, was the first bilateral agreement between China and India to contain the phrase Line of Actual Control. The agreement covered force level, consultations as a way forward and the role of a Joint Working Group. The agreement made it clear that there was an "ultimate solution to the boundary question between the two countries" which remained pending. It was also agreed that "the two sides agree that references to the line of actual control in this Agreement do not prejudice their respective positions on the boundary question".

Clarification of the LAC 

In article 10 of the 1996 border agreement, both sides agreed to the exchange of maps to help clarify the alignment of the LAC. It was only in 2001 when the first in-depth discussion would take place with regard to the central/middle sectors. Maps of Sikkim were exchanged, resulting in the "Memorandum on Expanding Border Trade". However the process of exchange of maps soon collapsed in 2002–2003 when other sectors were brought up. Shivshankar Menon writes that a drawback of the process of exchanging maps as a starting point to clarify the LAC was that it gave both sides an "incentive to exaggerate their claims of where the LAC lay".

On 30 July 2020, the Chinese Ambassador to India stated that China was not in favour of clarifying the LAC anymore as it would create new disputes. Similar viewpoints have been aired in India that China will keep the boundary dispute alive for as long as it can be used against India. On the other hand, there have been voices which say that clarifying the LAC would be beneficial for both countries.

Patrol points 

In the 1970s, India's China Study Group identified patrol points to which Indian forces would patrol. This was a better representation of how far India could patrol towards its perceived LAC and delimited India's limits of actual control. These periodic patrols were performed by both sides, and often crisscrossed.

Patrolling Points were identified by India's China Study Group in the 1970s to optimize patrolling effectiveness and resource utilization along the disputed and non-demarcarted China–India border at a time when border infrastructure was weak. Instead of patrolling the entire border which was more than 3000 km long, troops would just be required to patrol up to the patrolling points. Over time, as infrastructure, resources and troop capability improved and increased, the patrolling points were revised. The concept of patrol points came about well before India officially accepted the Line of Actual Control (LAC). Patrolling points give a more realistic on–ground guide of India's limits of actual control.

Most patrolling points are close to the LAC. However, in the Depsang plains, the patrolling points are said to remain well inside in LAC, despite having been revised a number of times. Former Army officers have said that patrolling points provide a better on-the-ground picture of India's limits of control. Based on location, the periodicity of visiting patrolling points can vary greatly from a few weeks to a couple of months. In some cases, the patrolling points are well-known landmarks such as mountain peaks or passes. In other cases, the pattrolling points are numbered, PP-1, PP-2 etc. There are over 65 patrolling points stretching from the Karakoram to Chumar.

The patrolling points within the LAC and the patrol routes that join them are known as 'limits of patrolling'. Some army officers call this the "LAC within the LAC" or the actual LAC. The various patrol routes to the limits of patrolling are called the 'lines of patrolling'.

During the 2020 China–India skirmishes, the patrolling points under dispute included PPs 10 to 13, 14, 15, 17, and 17A. On 18 September 2020, an article in The Hindu wrote that "since April, Indian troops have been denied access to PPs numbered 9, 10, 11, 12, 12A, 13, 14, 15, 17, 17A."

List of numbered patrol points 

 PP1 to PP3 —  near the Karakoram Pass
 PP8 to PP9 — in Depsang plains
 PP10 to PP13 including PP11A — in the Depsang Bulge from Raki Nala to Jivan Nala
 PP14 — in Galwan Valley
 PP15 — on the watershed between Kugrang and Galwan basins (called Jianan Pass by China).
 PP16, PP17 and PP17A — Kugrang River Valley, the last near Gogra
 PP18 to PP23 — southeast of Gogra, from the Silung Barma (Chang Chenmo River tributary) towards Pangong Tso

Border terminology 
Glossary of border related terms:

In fiction 
The Line of Actual Control is one of the settings in Neal Stephenson's novel Termination Shock, where volunteer martial artists from India and China fight to move the line in skirmishes covered on social media.

See also
Aksai Chin
Arunachal Pradesh
Border Personnel Meeting point
McMahon Line
Sino-Indian relations
Sino-Indian border dispute
Tibet

Notes

References

Bibliography

Further reading 
 
 Rup Narayan Das (May 2013) India-China Relations A New Paradigm. IDSA

External links 
 Borders of Ladakh, marked on OpenStreetMap represents the Line of Actual Control in the east and south (including the Demchok sector).
 Sushant Singh, Line of Actual Control: Where it is located, and where India and China differ, The Indian Express, 2 June 2020.
 Why China is playing hardball in Arunachal by Venkatesan Vembu, Daily News & Analysis, 13 May 2007
 Two maps of Kashmir: maps showing the Indian and Pakistani positions on the border.

1962 establishments in China
1962 establishments in India
1962 in international relations
Geography of India
China–India border
History of the Republic of India
China–India relations
Sino-Indian War
International borders